Thomas Onslow, 2nd Baron Onslow (27 November 1679 – 5 June 1740), of West Clandon, Surrey, was a British landowner and Whig politician who sat in the English and British House of Commons between 1702 and 1717. He commissioned the building of Clandon Park House in the 1730s.

Early life
Onslow was the only surviving son of Richard Onslow, 1st Baron Onslow. He was educated at Eton College from 1691 to 1693, and the travelled abroad in Holland and France from 1697 to 1698. He married Elizabeth Knight, the daughter of John Knight, a merchant of Jamaica, and niece of Colonel Charles Knight, and was heir to both their fortunes.

Political career
He represented a continuous succession of constituencies in the Parliament of England and Great Britain. He first entered Parliament in 1702, aged 22 or 23, as the MP for Gatton, Surrey, an underpopulated rural borough that had once had a market in the medieval period. He was then returned in 1705 to represent the larger settlement of Chichester, West Sussex, followed by Bletchingley (1708–1715) and finally the county seat of Surrey (1715–1717), which then included much of today's Greater London including, for example, Battersea and Lambeth. He was awarded LL.D at Cambridge University in 1717 and became 2nd Baron Onslow on the death of his father in 1717. He was a Teller of the Receipt of the Exchequer from 1718 to his death

Personal finances and family life

As Lord Onslow he was a leading participant in an insurance business known as Onslow's Insurance or Onslow's Bubble, which secured incorporation under the Bubble Act as Royal Exchange Assurance Corporation.

The Onslow family seat remains Clandon Park, East and West Clandon, Surrey.

Clandon Park House and its 7-acre garden, was gifted to the Nation in 1956, a National Trust and this mansion and gardens were for the most part commissioned by him.

The senior branch of the Onslow family continues to own and manage their agricultural business and the Clandon Park parkland to this day. However, in the 18th and 19th centuries the family owned several thousand acres of farmland scattered across many villages in Surrey from which they derived an income.

According to research carried out under University College London's Legacies of British Slave-ownership project, Clandon House was built by Onslow possibly as a result of his wife's slavery-derived fortune. The slave plantation which Elizabeth inherited was her uncle Charles' Whitehall Plantation in St Thomas-in-the-East, Jamaica.

He had one son, Richard, who succeeded him on his death in 1740.

References

1679 births
1740 deaths
People educated at Eton College
2
English MPs 1702–1705
English MPs 1705–1707
Members of the Parliament of Great Britain for English constituencies
British MPs 1707–1708
British MPs 1708–1710
British MPs 1710–1713
British MPs 1713–1715
British MPs 1715–1722
Lord-Lieutenants of Surrey
Thomas Onslow, 2nd Baron